Ouroboros is the sixth studio album by Ray LaMontagne, released on March 4, 2016. It features My Morning Jacket's frontman Jim James, who also produced the record. Lead single "Hey, No Pressure" debuted online on January 20, 2016. The rest of My Morning Jacket, minus James, joined LaMontagne on the road for the album's release tour.

Track listing
All songs written by Ray LaMontagne.
Part One
"Homecoming" – 8:28
"Hey, No Pressure" – 6:34			
"The Changing Man" – 4:13
"While It Still Beats" – 4:10
Part Two
"In My Own Way" – 6:36
"Another Day" – 3:05
"A Murmuration of Starlings" – 2:33
"Wouldn't It Make a Lovely Photograph" – 3:58

Personnel
Ray LaMontagne – vocals (1–6, 8), electric guitar (2, 3, 4, 5, 7), acoustic guitar (1, 2, 5, 6, 8)
Dan Dorff – CP70 (1, 3–8), RMI (1, 3, 4, 5, 7), piano (1, 3, 4), vibes (1, 7), Mellotron (3, 4), Trident synthesizer (3, 7), Multivox piano (2), Juno (2), pump organ (5), pocket piano (7)
Dave Givan – drums, percussion (1–5, 7, 8)
Jim James – electric guitar (2, 3, 4, 5, 7), background vocals (2, 3, 4, 5), saxophone (2), Juno (2), Trident synthesizer (7)
Seth Kaufman – bass (1–5, 7, 8), meditation box (1, 5, 6, 7), electric guitar textures (1, 2), slide guitar (2)
Alexis Marsh – background vocals (3, 4)
Kevin Ratterman – Moog bass (5, 7), piano strings (1), pocket piano (2), Moog F/X (6)

Charts

References

External links

2016 albums
Albums produced by Jim James
Ray LaMontagne albums
RCA Records albums
Psychedelic music albums by American artists
My Morning Jacket